Henry Pyne (before May 1688 - 28 February 1713) was a politician in Ireland.

He was a Member of the Parliament of Ireland for Dungarvan from 1709 to 1713.

References

 

Year of birth uncertain
1713 deaths
Irish MPs 1703–1713
Members of the Parliament of Ireland (pre-1801) for County Waterford constituencies